
Year 898 (DCCCXCVIII) was a common year starting on Sunday (link will display the full calendar) of the Julian calendar.

Events 
 By place 
 Europe 
 January 1 – King Odo I (or Eudes) dies at La Fère (Northern France) after a 10-year reign. His rival, the 18-year-old Charles the Simple in Laon, gains sovereignty and becomes ruler (with no real authority) of the West Frankish Kingdom. This puts an end to five years of civil war between the Frankish nobles.
 Summer – Adalbert II, margrave of Tuscany, revolts (pushed by his wife Bertha) against his cousin, Emperor Lambert II. The Tuscan army proceeds against the Lombard capital of Pavia. Lambert with his forces at Marengo defeats Adalbert at Borgo San Donnino, taking him, as a prisoner, to Pavia.
 October 15 – Lambert II dies from falling off his horse while hunting — or is killed (possibly assassinated by supporters of Maginulf of Milan). After the death of Lambert, his rival Berengar I gains recognition as king of Italy. He releases Adalbert II and receives homage from the Italian nobles.

 Britain 
 King Alfred the Great makes his eldest son Edward the Elder co-ruler of Wessex in preparation for his accession to the English throne.

 By topic 
 Religion 
 January – Pope John IX is consecrated and succeeds Theodore II as the 116th pope of the Catholic Church. His rival Serguis III (a Spoletan ally of Lambert II) is excommunicated and takes refuge at the court of Adalbert II. 
 John IX holds councils at Rome and Ravenna to rehabilitate the late Pope Formosus. He condemns the Cadaver Synod of the late Pope Stephen VI, and restores the clergymen who were deposed by Stephen's faction.

Births 
 Fu Yanqing, Chinese general (d. 975)
 He Ning, Chinese chancellor (d. 955)
 Hugh the Great, Father of Hugh Capet and progenitor of the Capetian Kings (approximate date) (d. 956)
 Li Congyan, Chinese general (d. 946)
 Sang Weihan, Chinese chief of staff (d. 947)

Deaths 
 January 1 – Odo I, king of the West Frankish Kingdom
 October 15 – Lambert II, king of Italy and Holy Roman Emperor
 Adalbold I, bishop of Utrecht (approximate date)
 Ahmad ibn Isa al-Shaybani, Muslim leader 
 Aitíth mac Laigni, king of Ulaid (Ireland)
 Al-Mubarrad, Muslim grammarian (b. 826)
 Athanasius, bishop and duke of Naples
 Doseon, Korean Buddhist monk (b. 826)
 Gagik Apumrvan Artsruni, Armenian prince
 Hsiang-yen Chih-hsien, Chinese Ch'an master
 Luo Hongxin, Chinese warlord (b. 836)
 Mashdotz I, Armenian monk and catholicos (or 897)
 Stephen, duke of Amalfi (approximate date)
 Wang Chao, Chinese warlord (b. 846)
 Ya'qubi, Muslim geographer (or 897)

References